Paralbara spicula is a moth in the family Drepanidae. It was described by Watson in 1968. It is found in Guangdong, China.

The length of the forewings is 14.5–17 mm. Adults are similar to Paralbara perhamata, but can be distinguished by the male and female genitalia.

References

Moths described in 1968
Drepaninae
Moths of Asia